Campbell Hot Springs (also known as Sierra Hot Springs) is a set of springs in Sierra County, California, United States which was turned into a resort in the 1880s.
The community was founded as a thermal springs resort in the 1880s.

Set in the scenic valley of Sierraville, this hot springs is open to the public year-round and 24/7. The four mains pool in this hot spring are: 1) The Temple Dome warm pool (98-100°), 2) The Hot Pool (105-110°), 3) The Meditation Pool (98-100°), 4) The Phoenix Baths (85-90°). The Temple Dome Pool area also houses a dry sauna.

The property is managed by the Sierra Hot Springs non-profit organization. The pools are clothing optional and family friendly.

References

Reference bibliography 

Hot springs of California
Unincorporated communities in California
Unincorporated communities in Sierra County, California